Hot Weather Football Championship, also known as the All India Hot Weather Football Championship, is an annual Indian football tournament held in Mandi, Himachal Pradesh and organized by All India Hot Weather Football Championship Organising Committee (AIHWFCOC). The tournament was first started in 1970, which was won by Sports School Jalandhar. Apart from some top clubs from Himachal, clubs from other Indian states also have participated in this competition.

FC Punjab Police has won the tournament for a record four times. The current champions are Reserve Bank of India who won the title by defeating Tamil Nadu Police at the 49th edition of the tournament in 2021.

Venue 
All matches are played at Paddal Ground of Mandi Himachal Pradesh.

Results

References

External links 

Football in Himachal Pradesh
Football cup competitions in India
1970 establishments in India
Recurring sporting events established in 1970